Tyree is an unincorporated community in Douglas County, in the U.S. state of Georgia.

History
A variant name was "Tyre". The community's name is derived from Tyre, Lebanon. A post office called Tyre was established in 1883, and remained in operation until 1904.

References

Unincorporated communities in Georgia (U.S. state)
Unincorporated communities in Douglas County, Georgia